There are two rivers named Xavante River in Brazil:

 Xavante River (Mato Grosso)
 Xavante River (Tocantins)

See also
 Xavante (disambiguation)